Krakra Bluff (Rid Krakra \'rid 'kra-kra\) is a rocky bluff of elevation 140 m surmounting Lukovo Point and Memorable Beach on the northwest coast of South Bay, Livingston Island in the South Shetland Islands, Antarctica.  The area was visited by early 19th century sealers operating from nearby Johnsons Dock.

The feature is named after the Bulgarian bolyar (boyar) and warrior Krakra of Pernik (10-11th Century).

Location

See also
 South Bay
 Livingston Island

Maps
 L.L. Ivanov et al. Antarctica: Livingston Island and Greenwich Island, South Shetland Islands. Scale 1:100000 topographic map. Sofia: Antarctic Place-names Commission of Bulgaria, 2005.
 L.L. Ivanov. Antarctica: Livingston Island and Greenwich, Robert, Snow and Smith Islands. Scale 1:120000 topographic map.  Troyan: Manfred Wörner Foundation, 2009.

Notes

References
 Krakra Bluff. SCAR Composite Antarctic Gazetteer
 Bulgarian Antarctic Gazetteer. Antarctic Place-names Commission. (details in Bulgarian, basic data in English)

External links
 Krakra Bluff. Adjusted Copernix satellite image

Cliffs of Livingston Island